Aq Kand (also Romanized as Āq Kand; also known as Āgh Kand, Agh Kand Sardrood, and Āq Kan) is a village in Razan Rural District, in the Central District of Razan County, Hamadan Province, Iran. At the 2006 census, its population was 264, in 61 families.

References 

Populated places in Razan County